A Break from the Norm is a compilation album arranged and released by British big beat musician Fatboy Slim, under his name of Norman Cook. It was released in 2001.

The album was released to illustrate where Cook obtained a number of his samples for famous Fatboy Slim songs, and as such most of the artists (and tracks) are relatively obscure.

Track listing

References 

Fatboy Slim compilation albums
2001 compilation albums